The Odysseus is a solar, High-Altitude Long Endurance drone developed by Aurora Flight Sciences.

Development 
Aurora Flight Sciences announced the Odysseus in November 2018.
In spring 2019, Aurora planned to fly a High-Altitude Long Endurance drone powered by solar cells and batteries, Odysseus, to study the Earth atmosphere or as a military pseudo-satellite for intelligence, surveillance and reconnaissance.
The 74.1m (243ft) wide carbon fibre aircraft should weigh less than a  Smart Car, can carry a 25kg (55lb) payload with 250W provided during several months of endurance.
It would compete with the Airbus Zephyr ordered by the UK Ministry of Defence and visited by the U.S. Army Futures Command, the BAE Systems-Prismatic Ltd UAV, and the AeroVironment-SoftBank telecommunications UAV. 
The bendable wing has fiberglass upper skin panels and plastic film undersides, three tails and six propellers, with roll controlled by the outboard tails.
It used available, low-risk, lithium polymer batteries and gallium arsenide thin-film solar cells and first test flights were to be powered by batteries only.
It was designed to stay day and night above  up to three months at latitudes up to 20°.
First flight was planned for April 2019 in Puerto Rico, before investigating ozone depletion in the summer over the US Midwest.
 
Its first flight was indefinitely delayed by July 2019.

See also
 AeroVironment Global Observer
 Airbus Zephyr
 Aurora Flight Sciences Orion
 Boeing SolarEagle
 Facebook Aquila

References

External links
 
 
 
 

Unmanned aerial vehicles of the United States
Aurora Flight Sciences aircraft
electric aircraft